HuGE is a high-end style magazine published by Kodansha in Japan. The magazine was established in 2004 and targets young men. It is published on a monthly basis. The headquarters is in Tokyo.

References

External links
 Huge (official site)

2004 establishments in Japan
Men's magazines published in Japan
Monthly magazines published in Japan
Kodansha magazines
Magazines established in 2004
Magazines published in Tokyo
Men's fashion magazines
Visual arts magazines